Laurel Ridge State Park is a  Pennsylvania state park that passes through Cambria, Fayette, Somerset, and Westmoreland counties, Pennsylvania in the United States.

History and location 
The park is made up of several non-contiguous tracts, separated by various state game lands and state forest districts, on top of the Laurel Hill geologic formation. The park was approved by Pennsylvania Governor Raymond P. Shafer on July 10, 1967.

Much of the 70-mile Laurel Highlands Hiking Trail travels through Laurel Ridge State Park. That trail begins at Ohiopyle State Park to the southwest and reaches Conemaugh Gorge near Johnstown. All of that trail's overnight shelter areas are within the grounds of the state park. 

The park, as well as the Laurel Highlands Hiking Trail, lie within the Appalachian mixed mesophytic forests ecoregion.

Recreation
In addition to hiking, the park is open to hunting, cross-country skiing, and snowmobiling.
Hunting is permitted on almost all of Laurel Ridge State Park. The most common game species are ruffed grouse, turkey and white-tailed deer. The hunting of groundhogs is prohibited. Hunters are expected to follow the rules and regulations of the Pennsylvania Game Commission.

Nearby state parks

The following state parks are within  of Laurel Ridge State Park:
Blue Knob State Park (Bedford County)
Keystone State Park (Westmoreland County)
Kooser State Park (Somerset County)
Laurel Hill State Park (Somerset County)
Laurel Mountain State Park (Westmoreland County)
Laurel Summit State Park (Westmoreland County)
Linn Run State Park (Westmoreland County)
Ohiopyle State Park (Fayette County)
Yellow Creek State Park (Indiana County)

References

External links

  
  

State parks of Pennsylvania
State parks of the Appalachians
Parks in the Pittsburgh metropolitan area
Laurel Highlands
Parks in Westmoreland County, Pennsylvania
Parks in Fayette County, Pennsylvania
Parks in Somerset County, Pennsylvania
Parks in Cambria County, Pennsylvania
Protected areas established in 1967
Protected areas of Cambria County, Pennsylvania
Protected areas of Fayette County, Pennsylvania
Protected areas of Somerset County, Pennsylvania
Protected areas of Westmoreland County, Pennsylvania